Zsigmond Móricz (29 June 1879, Tiszacsécse – 4 September 1942) was a major Hungarian novelist and Social Realist.

Biography 
Zsigmond Móricz was born in Tiszacsécse in 1879 to Bálint Móricz and Erzsébet Pallagi. On his mother's side, he came from an impoverished but ancient noble family while his father was the descendant of serfs. He studied at Debreceni Református Kollégium (1891–1893), Sárospataki Kollégium (1894–1896), and in Kisújszállás and Szakoly (1896–1898). In 1899, he enrolled at Debreceni Református Kollégium to study theology, but transferred into law after only six months.

In 1903, he began to work as a journalist at the newspaper Az Újság, remaining there until 1909.

During the revolutionary government after World War I, he was vice president of the Vörösmarty Academy. After its fall, his plays were not performed in the National Theater, and his work was published only in Nyugat and Az Est. At the end of 1929 he became the prose editor for Nyugat.

In 1905 Moricz married Eugénia Holics.  Suffering from depression, she committed suicide in 1925. He married for a second time in 1926 to Mária Simonyi.

His novels expressed the lives of the Hungarian peasantry and dealt with issues of poverty.

Works 
 Kivilágos kivirradtig (Until the Small Hours of Morning) (1924)
 Légy jó mindhalálig (Be Faithful Unto Death) (1920)
 Úri muri (Very Merry) (1928)
 Rokonok (Relatives) (1932)
 Hét krajcár (Seven Pennies and Other Short Stories) (1907)
 Az ezüstkirály sípja. Iromba J (Silver King's Flute; Broody Jankó)
 Sárarany (Gold in the Mud: A Hungarian Peasant Novel) (1911)
 Az Isten háta mögött (In the Godforsaken Hinterlands: A Tale of Provincial Hungary) (1911)
 Árvácska (Orphalina) (1941)

Criticism

 The Novels of Zsigmond Móricz in the Context of European Realism: A Thematic Approach (by Virginia L. Lewis) (2023)

Legacy
 Móricz Zsigmond körtér in Budapest is named after him, as is its metro station.
 Móricz Zsigmond Gimnázium'' in Budapest is named after him.

References

External links

 
  
 Babelguides: Zsigmond Móricz
 Hungarian short stories
 

1879 births
1942 deaths
People from Szabolcs-Szatmár-Bereg County
Hungarian male novelists
Burials at Kerepesi Cemetery
20th-century Hungarian novelists
20th-century Hungarian male writers